This is the discography for American pop singer songwriter James Fauntleroy.

Albums

Extended plays
 String Theory Acoustic (2014)
 The Warmest Winter Ever II (2016)
 DOJO (2017)

Mixtapes 
Leading By Example (2010)
The Warmest Winter Ever (2014)
The Coldest Summer Ever (2015)

Singles

As a featured artist

Other charted songs

Guest appearances

Writing discography 

Writing credits adapted from ASCAP.

References 

Discographies of American artists
Pop music discographies
Rhythm and blues discographies